Enzo Tesic (born 7 January 2000) is a French swimmer. He competed in the men's 4 × 200 metre freestyle relay at the 2020 Summer Olympics.

References

External links
 

2000 births
Living people
French male freestyle swimmers
Olympic swimmers of France
Swimmers at the 2020 Summer Olympics
Place of birth missing (living people)
European Aquatics Championships medalists in swimming
21st-century French people
People from Tournan-en-Brie
Sportspeople from Seine-et-Marne